List of Provinces of Japan > Saikaidō > Satsuma Province > Izumi District

Japan > Kyūshū >  Kagoshima Prefecture > Izumi District

 is a district located in Kagoshima Prefecture, Japan.

The district contains one town.
Nagashima

References

District Izumi
Izumi District